Mirrngadja is a village in north-eastern Arnhem Land, in the Top End of the Northern Territory of Australia.  It lies south-east of, and close to, the Arafura Swamp and the Arafura Jungles.

References

Aboriginal communities in the Northern Territory
Geography of the Northern Territory